The 1910 Western State Normal Hilltoppers football team represented Western State Normal School (later renamed Western Michigan University) as an independent during the 1910 college football season.  Head coach William H. Spaulding was the head coach. Halfback Alvin Berger was the team captain.

Schedule

Players
 Alvin Berger, left halfback and captain
 Conklin, right end
 John Damoth, right halfback, Wayland, Michigan
 Charles Anthony Lefevre, center, Kalamazoo
 Martin, left end
 Mayer, fullback
 Howard Russell, right guard, Alamo, Michigan
 Sooy, quarterback
 Van de Walker, right tackle
 Warren, left guard
 Webb, left tackle
 Windoes, right tackle

References

Western State Normal Hilltoppers
Western Michigan Broncos football seasons
Western State Normal Hilltoppers football